Maiti is an Indian surname that may refer to
Abha Maiti (born 1925), Indian politician
Ajit Kumar Maiti (born 1928), Indian neurophysiologist
Kalobaran Maiti (born 1967), Indian physicist
Mrigendra Nath Maiti, Indian politician
Samarpan Maiti (born 1988), Indian scientist, human rights activist and model
Souvik Maiti (born 1971), Indian chemist

See also
Maiti Nepal, a non-profit organization helping the victims of sex trafficking